Utshober Por is the second studio album by Bangladeshi rock band Black, released in 2003. Musically it was a change in direction for Black, the album started off to selling a significant number of copies yet to little fanfare but generally favorable critical reception and is now considered to be one of the most significant alternative rock records in Bangladesh. The album features guest vocal performances by singer and The Daily Star journalist Elita Karim in three tracks and a much-maligned rap performance by rapper Mark.

Track listing

Production

 Recorded by Imran Ahmed Choudhury Mobin & Isha Khan Duray
 Recorded at Sound Garden
 Mixed and mastered by Isha Khan Duray
 Mastering Co-ordinator: Zooel
 Studio crews: Porimal, Achinto, Sukanto 
 Photography: Khademul Insan
 Graphics: Rubait Islam

Line up

 Jon - vocals, guitar
 Jahan - lead guitar
 Miraz - bass
 Tony - drums
 Tahsan: vocals, keyboard

Guest musicians

 Chowdhury Shakib (Cryptic Fate): Vocals (Track 4)
 Elita: Vocals (Track 3, 11, 15)
 Mark (Sellout): Rap Vocals (Track 14)
 Zubair Malik: Flute (Track 11)

2003 albums
Black (Bangladeshi band) albums